Amandine Allou Affoué (born 29 August 1980 in Botro) is a Côte d'Ivoire sprinter who specializes in the 100 and 200 metres.

Allou represented Côte d'Ivoire at the 2008 Summer Olympics in Beijing competing at the 100 metres sprint. In her first round heat she placed fifth in a time of 11.75 which was not enough to advance to the second round.

Competition record

Personal bests
60 metres - 7.34 s (2006, indoor)
100 metres - 11.27 s (2007)
200 metres - 23.08 s (2005)
4 x 100 metres relay - 43.89 s (2001) - national record.

References

External links

1980 births
Living people
Ivorian female sprinters
Olympic athletes of Ivory Coast
Athletes (track and field) at the 2000 Summer Olympics
Athletes (track and field) at the 2004 Summer Olympics
Athletes (track and field) at the 2008 Summer Olympics
World Athletics Championships athletes for Ivory Coast
People from Vallée du Bandama District
African Games bronze medalists for Ivory Coast
African Games medalists in athletics (track and field)
Athletes (track and field) at the 2003 All-Africa Games
Athletes (track and field) at the 2007 All-Africa Games